Cowpen Marsh is a 116.8 hectare biological Site of Special Scientific Interest in County Durham, England notified in 1966.

SSSIs are designated by Natural England, formally English Nature, which uses the 1974–1996 county system. This means there is no grouping of SSSIs by Stockton-on-Tees unitary authority, or County Durham which is the relevant ceremonial county . As such Cowpen Marsh is one of 18 SSSIs in the Cleveland area of search.

References

Sources

External links
 English Nature (SSSI information)
 Site boundary map at English Nature's "Nature on the Map" website

Sites of Special Scientific Interest in Cleveland, England
Sites of Special Scientific Interest notified in 1966